The Imam and the Indian is a collection of essays by the Indian writer Amitav Ghosh. It was published in 2015 its about a man named iman and an indian

2002 non-fiction books
Indian essay collections
21st-century Indian books
Books by Amitav Ghosh